Tampereen Pyrintö ry is a Finnish multi-sport club from Tampere. Pyrintö representatives have achieved several Olympic medals and other success. In the year 2017, Pyrintö has sport sections in cross-country skiing, basketball, ski jumping, weightlifting, orienteering, athletics, cheerleading, and speed skating. In the past it has also had teams in pesäpallo and ice hockey.

Sport sections

Athletics 

In athletics, Pyrintö is one of Finland's most successful clubs. Long jumper Tommi Evilä, javelin thrower Tero Järvenpää and hammer thrower Mia Strömmer have been club's internationally most notable athletes in recent years. In the past, Pyrintö athletes, like Akilles Järvinen, Eero Berg and Hugo Lahtinen, won several Olympic medals.

Basketball 

Pyrintö's men's basketball team plays in Korisliiga, the highest tier of Finnish basketball. It has won two titles (2010, 2011) and Finnish cup once. In season 2011–12 the team also participated in EuroChallenge. Some Finnish internationals, for example Antti Nikkilä, former NBA player Eric Washington and World and European champion Heino Enden have all played in Pyrintö.

Club's women's team has won eight Finnish championships and national cup once. It played FIBA Women's European Champions Cup in the season 1986–87.

Orienteering 

Pyrintö's orienteering section has gained much success during its long existence. World champions Jarkko Huovila and Outi Borgenström have represented Pyrintö, as well as current women's national team members Anni-Maija Fincke and Venla Niemi. Pyrintö has won Jukola relay, Venla relay and Tiomila several times.

Other notable Pyrintö representatives 
 Hilkka Riihivuori, cross-country skier, Olympic medalist
 Jaakko Kailajärvi, weightlifter
 Jouni Kailajärvi, weightlifter
 Pekka Niemi, weightlifter, Olympic medalist
 Jaakko Friman, speed skater, Olympic medalist
 Pentti Lammio, speed skater, Olympic medalist

Former sports

Pesäpallo 

In the native sport of Finland, pesäpallo, Pyrintö won four times women's Finnish championship (1933, 1935, 1936 and 1937). Club's men's team achieved silver in 1925 and bronze in 1926 and 1949.

External links 
 

Multi-sport clubs in Finland
Orienteering clubs in Finland
Sports clubs established in 1896
Sports teams in Finland
Pyrinto